Leonard L. Johnson (born January 26, 1946) is a former professional American football Center for the New York Giants of the National Football League. He played college football at St. Cloud State University.

References

1946 births
Living people
Minnesota Vikings players
New York Giants players
St. Cloud State Huskies football players
Players of American football from Minnesota
American football offensive linemen